Bertus "Ben" Stom (13 October 1886 – 18 August 1965) was a Dutch footballer who earned 9 caps for the Dutch national side between 1905 and 1908.

References

External links
 Player profile at VoetbalStats.nl

1886 births
1965 deaths
Dutch footballers
Netherlands international footballers
Sportspeople from Apeldoorn

Association footballers not categorized by position
Footballers from Gelderland